Timothy Samuel Elliott (born December 24, 1986) is an American mixed martial artist who currently competes in the Flyweight division of the Ultimate Fighting Championship (UFC). He is the former Titan FC Flyweight Champion. He has been professional competitor since 2009 and is currently in his second tenure with the UFC.  He is a four-time winner of bonuses in the UFC, winning Fight of the Night three times, Performance of the Night once and won The Ultimate Fighter: Tournament of Champions. As of December 19, 2022, he is #11 in the UFC flyweight rankings.

Background
Elliott was born on December 24, 1986, in Wichita, Kansas. Elliott originally attended Campus High School, but transferred to Wichita South High School during his junior year. Elliott was a state wrestling champion at Wichita South his senior year in 2005. Elliott was on the wrestling team at Labette Community College before transferring to the University of Central Oklahoma. He earned a bachelor's degree in Science and General Studies.

Mixed martial arts career

Early career
Elliott compiled a record of 8–2–1 in his first 11 fights before signing with the UFC, including a notable KO victory over former UFC Lightweight Champion Jens Pulver.

Ultimate Fighting Championship
Elliott signed with UFC on April 17, 2012.

In his UFC debut, Elliott faced The Ultimate Fighter 14 winner John Dodson on May 5, 2012, at UFC on Fox 3, replacing an injured Darren Uyenoyama. Elliott lost the fight via unanimous decision.

In his second fight, Elliott faced Jared Papazian on December 15, 2012, at The Ultimate Fighter: Team Carwin vs. Team Nelson Finale. He won the fight via unanimous decision (30–25, 30–25, 30–26). The fight also earned him the Fight of the Night bonus.

For his third fight, Elliott faced Louis Gaudinot on August 31, 2013, at UFC 164. He won the fight via unanimous decision.

Elliott fought Ali Bagautinov at UFC 167 on November 16, 2013. The bout marked his first appearance on the main card of a pay-per-view event in the fight. He lost the fight via unanimous decision.

Elliott faced Joseph Benavidez on April 26, 2014, at UFC 172. He lost the fight via submission in the first round.

Elliott was expected to face Wilson Reis on August 23, 2014, at UFC Fight Night 49.  However, Elliott pulled out of the bout in the days leading up to the event.

Elliott faced Zach Makovsky on February 15, 2015, at UFC Fight Night 60. He lost the fight by unanimous decision. Following the fight, he was released from the organization.

Titan FC

Elliott made his debut and faced former UFC Flyweight Iliarde Santos at Titan FC 34 for the inaugural Titan FC Flyweight Championship. He won the fight by a dominant unanimous decision and picked up the Titan FC Flyweight Championship.

For his first title defense, Elliott faced undefeated prospect and promotional newcomer Felipe Efrain at Titan FC 35 on September 19, 2015. He won the fight by submission in the second round.

Elliott next faced former UFC Bantamweight Pedro Nobre at Titan FC 37 on March 5, 2016. He won the fight by unanimous decision for his second successful title defense.

The Ultimate Fighter
On July 21, 2016, Elliott was announced as a cast member on the 24th season of The Ultimate Fighter. The winner of the show, won a chance to fight Demetrious Johnson for the UFC Flyweight Championship. Despite being ranked as the number 3 seed, Elliott was selected as the first overall pick by former opponent Joseph Benavidez.

In his first fight, Elliott faced 14th ranked 'Team Cejudo' fighter Charlie Alaniz. He submitted Aniz in the first round by bulldog choke. In the quarterfinals, Elliott faced 6th ranked 'Team Cejudo' fighter and former Caged contestant Matt Schnell. Despite being struck with a devastating groin kick in the opening moments of the bout, he was able to recover and submit Schnell in the first round by front choke. In the semifinals, Elliott faced 15th ranked 'Team Benavidez' teammate Eric Shelton. After two competitive rounds, Elliott was declared the winner by majority decision. Elliott fought 5th ranked 'Team Benavidez' teammate Hiromasa Ougikubo in the final round. Elliott won the fight by unanimous decision 30–27 to win the tournament.

Return to the UFC
As a result of winning The Ultimate Fighter 24, Elliott won the opportunity to fight flyweight champion Demetrious Johnson. He fought Johnson on December 3, 2016, at The Ultimate Fighter 24 Finale for the flyweight championship.
Elliott lost the fight by unanimous decision.

Elliott faced Louis Smolka on April 15, 2017, at UFC on Fox: Johnson vs. Reis. He won the fight by unanimous decision. The win earned Elliott his second Fight of the Night bonus award, and his first since returning the organization.

Elliott faced Ben Nguyen on June 10, 2017, at UFC Fight Night 110. He was submitted with a rear-naked choke in the opening minute of the first round.

Elliott was expected to face Justin Scoggins on December 16, 2017, at UFC on Fox 26. However, Scoggins pulled out of the bout in early December citing a back injury and was replaced by Pietro Menga. The bout was cancelled as Menga failed to show to the weigh in because he did not make weight. Elliott was offered the fight at catchweight at 131 pounds, which would have given him 10% of Menga's fight purse, but he declined.

After the fight against Menga was cancelled, the UFC offered Elliott a fight at UFC 219, which Elliott only accepted under the condition he fights somebody who has never missed weight and has never backed out of a fight at the last minute. Elliott fought promotional newcomer Mark De La Rosa at bantamweight. He won in the second round by submission via an anaconda choke. After the fight, he dedicated the win to his coach, Robert Follis, who died earlier in the month. For the fight, Elliott won a $50,000 Performance of the Night bonus, his first performance of the night bonus and third fight bonus in the UFC overall.

Elliott tore his ACL in June 2018. He underwent successful surgery on it on June 14. He stated at the time that he expected miss at least a year before he could fight again.

Elliott faced Deiveson Figueiredo on October 12, 2019, at UFC on ESPN+ 19. He lost the fight via submission in the first round.

Elliott faced Askar Askarov January 18, 2020 at UFC 246. He lost the fight via unanimous decision.

Elliot faced promotional newcomer Brandon Royval on May 30, 2020, at UFC on ESPN: Woodley vs. Burns. He lost the fight via submission in the second round. This fight earned Elliott his third Fight of the Night award. Elliott accepted a fight against Tyson Nam at UFC Fight Night: Eye vs. Calvillo, but the NSAC refused to allow him to fight since they placed him on a medical suspension after his previous fight.

Elliott fought Ryan Benoit on July 16, 2020, at UFC Fight Night: Kattar vs. Ige. He won the fight by unanimous decision, securing his first win since 2017. Prior to the fight, he had signed a new four-fight contract with the promotion. On August 3, 2020, it was reported that Elliott had tested positive for marijuana after the fight and is facing a suspension. Later that day, he posted to his Twitter blaming the positive test on taking the fight on short notice. Elliott was suspended four and a half months and fined 15% if his purse by the Nevada State Athletic Commission on September 3, 2020, after positive for marijuana.  The suspension is retroactive to June 17, 2020, and he will be eligible to compete again on November 2, 2020.

Elliott was expected to face Jordan Espinosa on January 16, 2021, at UFC on ABC 1.  However, Espinosa tested positive for COVID-19 in late December and the pairing was moved to UFC 259. Elliott won the fight via unanimous decision. During the fight, Elliott accused Espinoza of being a "woman beater" after someone sent Elliott screenshot of messages between Espinoza and an unnamed girl along with images of choke marks on a person's neck. Espinoza responded by saying, "you don't know the whole story". Police stated that Espinoza had never been convicted of domestic abuse.

Elliott was scheduled to face Su Mudaerji on June 26, 2021, at UFC Fight Night 190 However, Mudaerji had to pull out off the bout due to a knee injury that required surgery.

Elliott faced Matheus Nicolau on October 9, 2021, at UFC Fight Night 194. He lost the fight via unanimous decision.

Elliott faced  Tagir Ulanbekov on March 5, 2022, at UFC 272. He won the fight via unanimous decision. 12 out of 17 media scores gave it to Ulanbekov.

Elliot was scheduled to face Amir Albazi on June 25, 2022 at UFC on ESPN 38 but pulled out due to undisclosed reasons.

Elliot is scheduled to face Allan Nascimento on June 3, 2023, at UFC Fight Night 226.

Personal life
Elliott primarily lives and trains in Las Vegas, Nevada. He is in a relationship with fellow UFC fighter Gina Mazany. On July 28, 2020, Elliott announced on his Instagram that he and Mazany were engaged. He has one daughter from a previous relationship.

Championships and accomplishments

Mixed martial arts
Ultimate Fighting Championship
Fight of the Night (three times) vs. Jared Papazian, Louis Smolka and Brandon Royval
Performance of the Night (one time) vs. Mark De La Rosa
Most decision bouts in the UFC Flyweight division (11)
Titan FC
Titan FC Flyweight Championship (one time; first, former)
Two successful title defenses

Mixed martial arts record

|-
|Win
|align=center|18–12–1
|Tagir Ulanbekov
|Decision (unanimous)
|UFC 272
|
|align=center|3
|align=center|5:00
|Las Vegas, Nevada, United States
|
|-
|Loss
|align=center|17–12–1
|Matheus Nicolau
|Decision (unanimous)
|UFC Fight Night: Dern vs. Rodriguez
|
|align=center|3
|align=center|5:00
|Las Vegas, Nevada, United States
|
|-
|Win
|align=center|17–11–1
|Jordan Espinosa
|Decision (unanimous)
|UFC 259
|
|align=center|3
|align=center|5:00
|Las Vegas, Nevada, United States
|
|-
|Win
|align=center|16–11–1
|Ryan Benoit
|Decision (unanimous)
|UFC on ESPN: Kattar vs. Ige 
|
|align=center|3
|align=center|5:00
|Abu Dhabi, United Arab Emirates
|
|-
|Loss
|align=center|15–11–1
|Brandon Royval
|Submission (arm-triangle choke)
|UFC on ESPN: Woodley vs. Burns
|
|align=center|2
|align=center|3:18
|Las Vegas, Nevada, United States
|
|-
|Loss
|align=center|
|Askar Askarov
|Decision (unanimous)
|UFC 246 
|
|align=center|3
|align=center|5:00
|Las Vegas, Nevada, United States
| 
|-
|Loss
|align=center|15–9–1
|Deiveson Figueiredo
|Submission (guillotine choke)
|UFC Fight Night: Joanna vs. Waterson 
|
|align=center|1
|align=center|3:08
|Tampa, Florida, United States
|
|- 
|Win
|align=center|15–8–1
|Mark De La Rosa
|Submission (anaconda choke)
|UFC 219 
|
|align=center|2
|align=center|1:41
|Las Vegas, Nevada, United States
|
|-
|Loss
|align=center|14–8–1
|Ben Nguyen
|Submission (rear-naked choke)
|UFC Fight Night: Lewis vs. Hunt
|
|align=center|1
|align=center|0:49
|Auckland, New Zealand
|
|-
|Win
|align=center|14–7–1
|Louis Smolka
|Decision (unanimous)
|UFC on Fox: Johnson vs. Reis
|
|align=center|3
|align=center|5:00
|Kansas City, Missouri, United States
|
|-
|Loss
|align=center|13–7–1
|Demetrious Johnson
|Decision (unanimous)
|The Ultimate Fighter: Tournament of Champions Finale 
|
|align=center|5
|align=center|5:00
|Las Vegas, Nevada, United States
|
|-
|Win
|align=center|13–6–1
|Pedro Nobre
|Decision (unanimous)
|Titan FC 37
|
|align=center|5
|align=center|5:00
|Ridgefield, Washington, United States
|
|-
|Win
|align=center|12–6–1
|Felipe Efrain
|Submission (guillotine choke)
|Titan FC 35
|
|align=center|2
|align=center|2:30
|Ridgefield, Washington, United States
|
|-
|Win
|align=center|11–6–1
|Iliarde Santos
|Decision (unanimous)
|Titan FC 34
|
|align=center|5
|align=center|5:00
|Kansas City, Missouri, United States
|
|-
|Loss
|align=center|10–6–1
|Zach Makovsky
|Decision (unanimous)
|UFC Fight Night: Henderson vs. Thatch
|
|align=center|3
|align=center|5:00
|Broomfield, Colorado, United States
|
|-
|Loss
|align=center|10–5–1
|Joseph Benavidez
|Submission (guillotine choke)
|UFC 172
|
|align=center| 1
|align=center| 4:08
|Baltimore, Maryland, United States
|
|-
|Loss
|align=center|10–4–1
|Ali Bagautinov
|Decision (unanimous)
|UFC 167
|
|align=center|3
|align=center|5:00
|Las Vegas, Nevada, United States
|
|-
|Win
|align=center|10–3–1
|Louis Gaudinot
|Decision (unanimous)
|UFC 164
|
|align=center|3
|align=center|5:00
|Milwaukee, Wisconsin, United States
|
|-
|Win
|align=center|9–3–1
|Jared Papazian
|Decision (unanimous)
|The Ultimate Fighter: Team Carwin vs. Team Nelson Finale
|
|align=center|3
|align=center|5:00
|Las Vegas, Nevada, United States
| 
|-
|Loss 
|align=center|8–3–1
|John Dodson
|Decision (unanimous)
|UFC on Fox: Diaz vs. Miller
|
|align=center|3
|align=center|5:00
|East Rutherford, New Jersey, United States
| 
|-
|Win
|align=center|8–2–1
|Josh Rave
|Technical Submission (D'Arce choke)
|RFA 2
|
|align=center|1
|align=center|0:28
|Kearney, Nebraska, United States
|
|-
|Win
|align=center|7–2–1
|Jens Pulver
|KO (knee)
|RFA 1 
|
|align=center|2
|align=center|2:12
|Kearney, Nebraska, United States
|
|-
|Win
|style="text-align:center;"|6–2–1
|Kashif Solarin 
|Submission
|Cowboy MMA: Caged Cowboys
|
|align=center|1
|align=center|0:57
|Ponca City, Oklahoma, United States
|
|-
|Win
|align=center|5–2–1
|John McDowell
|TKO (punches)
|Art of War Cage Fights 
|
|align=center|1
|align=center|2:56
|Ponca City, Oklahoma, United States
|
|-
|Win
|align=center|4–2–1
|Victor Dominguez
|Decision (unanimous)
|C3 Fights   
|
|align=center|3
|align=center|5:00
|Newkirk, Oklahoma, United States
|
|-
|Win
|align=center|3–2–1
|Cody Fuller
|Submission (triangle choke) 
|Bricktown Brawl 5
|
|align=center|3
|align=center|2:34
|Oklahoma City, Oklahoma, United States
|
|-
|Win
|align=center|2–2–1
|Michael Casteel
|Submission (rear-naked choke) 
|Bricktown Brawl 4
|
|align=center|1
|align=center|2:01
|Oklahoma City, Oklahoma, United States
|
|-
|Win
|align=center|1–2–1
|Victor Veloquio 
|KO (punches) 
|BB 3: Holiday Havoc 
|
|align=center|1
|align=center|0:33
|Oklahoma City, Oklahoma, United States
|
|-
|Loss
|align=center|0–2–1
|Jacky Bryant
|TKO (punches) 
|Bricktown Brawl 2
|
|align=center|1
|align=center|0:52
|Oklahoma City, Oklahoma, United States
|
|-
|Loss
|align=center|0–1–1
|Shane Howell
|Submission (triangle choke)
|Harrah Fight Night
|
|align=center|3
|align=center|2:25
|Harrah, Oklahoma, United States
|
|-
|Draw
|align=center|0–0–1
|Jerod Spoon
|Draw
|Bricktown Brawl 1
|
|align=center|3
|align=center|5:00
|Oklahoma City, Oklahoma, United States
|

Mixed martial arts exhibition record

|-
|Win
|align=center|4–0
| Hiromasa Ougikubo
| Decision (unanimous)
| rowspan=4| The Ultimate Fighter: Tournament of Champions
| 
|align=center|3
|align=center|5:00
| rowspan=4|Las Vegas, Nevada, United States
|
|-
|Win
|align=center|3–0
| Eric Shelton
| Decision (majority)
| 
|align=center|2
|align=center|5:00
|
|-
|Win
|align=center|2–0
|  Matt Schnell
| Submission (front choke)
| 
|align=center|1
|align=center|3:24
|
|-
|Win
|align=center|1–0
| Charlie Alaniz
| Submission (bulldog choke)
| 
|align=center|1
|align=center|1:51
|

See also
 List of male mixed martial artists

References

External links
 
 

1986 births
Living people
American male mixed martial artists
Mixed martial artists from Kansas
Sportspeople from Wichita, Kansas
People from Sedgwick County, Kansas
Central Oklahoma Bronchos wrestlers
Flyweight mixed martial artists
Mixed martial artists utilizing collegiate wrestling
Mixed martial artists utilizing Brazilian jiu-jitsu
American practitioners of Brazilian jiu-jitsu
Ultimate Fighting Championship male fighters
American sportspeople in doping cases
Doping cases in mixed martial arts